Temotu can refer to:

 Temotu Province, a province of the Solomon Islands
 Temotu, Tuvalu, an island in Vaitupu, Tuvalu
 Temotu, Kiribati, a village on Marakei, Kiribati

See also 
 Temotu languages